These are the results from the synchronised swimming competition at the 1973 World Aquatics Championships, which took place in Belgrade.

Medal table

Medal summary

References
https://www.fina.org/sites/default/files/histofina_sy_final_2_0.pdf

 
1973 in synchronized swimming
Synchronised swimming
Synchronised swimming at the World Aquatics Championships
Synchronised swimming in Serbia